The Ortolo Reservoir is a reservoir in the Corse-du-Sud department of France on the island of Corsica.

Location

The Ortolo reservoir is formed by a dam (Barrage de l'Ortolo) that impounds the Ortolo river. 
Other affluents are the Ruisseau de Latagu and the Ruisseau de Caraglia.
The southwest end and the dam are in the commune of Sartène, while the bulk of the reservoir is in the commune of Levie.
The reservoir is to the north of the  Punta d'Ovace.

Dam

The dam is owned by the Collectivité Territoriale de Corse and operated by the Office d’Equipement Hydraulique de Corse.
It is made of riprap.
There is a needled nonwoven polypropylene geotextile between the geomembrane and the slabs.
The concrete slabs were cast in place.

The dam provides water for irrigation.

Fishing is allowed, including angling or casting from the shore, fishing from a flat-bottomed boat without a motor, or from a float tube.

History
The dam was filled in 1995.
It came into service in 1996.

Over the first twenty years the structure suffered severe degradation.
In March 2014 farmers in Cauria-Tizzano-Conca in Sartène staged a protest because they were not receiving water from the dam.
Repair work started in 2016 but was interrupted by floods in November and December that year.
Work resumed in November 2017.

See also

List of waterbodies of Corse-du-Sud

Notes

Sources

Reservoirs of Corsica